Under the Tonto Rim is a 1947 American Western film directed by Lew Landers and starring Tim Holt, Nan Leslie, and Richard Martin. Written by Norman Houston and based on the novel Under the Tonto Rim by Zane Grey, the film is about a gang of outlaws who rob a stagecoach and kill one of the drivers. The stagecoach owner goes undercover to learn the identities and location of the gang leaders. The novel had been adapted to film twice before, in 1928 and 1933, under the same title.

Premise
A cowboy goes undercover to get the gang who killed his driver.

Cast
 Tim Holt as Brad Canfield 
 Nan Leslie as Lucy Dennison
 Richard Martin as Chito Rafferty
 Richard Powers as Dennison
 Carol Forman as Juanita
 Tony Barrett as Roy Patton
 Harry Harvey as Sheriff 
 Robert Clarke as Hooker
 Jay Norris as Andy 
 Lex Barker as Joe, deputy 
 Steve Savage as Curly 
 Richard Foote as Henry, deputy

Production
In the film, Tim Holt's character smokes a cigarette and has a drink, which was unusual for cowboy stars at the time.

References

External list
 
 
Review of film at Variety

1947 films
1947 Western (genre) films
American Western (genre) films
Films based on works by Zane Grey
Films based on American novels
Films directed by Lew Landers
Remakes of American films
RKO Pictures films
American black-and-white films
Films scored by Paul Sawtell
1940s English-language films
1940s American films